Alaska Highway generally refers to the highway in Canada and Alaska, which also include:
 British Columbia Highway 97
 Yukon Highway 1
 Alaska Route 2

Other uses include:
 Alaska Highway (film)
 "Alaska Highway", a song on Dan Bern's album New American Language
 Alaska Highway News
 Alaskan Way Viaduct in Seattle, Washington 
 Alaskan Way Viaduct replacement tunnel
 Alaska Marine Highway

See also 
 List of Alaska Routes